Sardis Primitive Baptist Church and Cemetery is a historic Primitive Baptist church and cemetery in Madison, North Carolina. Founded in 1801, it is one of the oldest church congregations in Rockingham County.

History 
Sardis Church was organized on March 25, 1801. The first church building was constructed in 1806 on a plot of land near the town of Madison, donated by Zachariah Wall. The second church building, a log school house, was in the Ellisboro community on the south side of the Dan River. The congregation constructed a third building in 1900; a plain, one-room wooden building on the site of the current church. The fourth and current building was built in 1913 and is made of brick. 

The church follows the Primitive Baptist tradition and was a member of the Mayo Association until 1909, when the Salem Association was formed. It is one of the oldest churches in Rockingham County.

Notable burials 
 Benny Carter, American painter and sculptor
 J. P. Carter, American politician and military officer

References 

1801 establishments in North Carolina
19th-century Baptist churches in the United States
Baptist cemeteries in the United States
Baptist churches in North Carolina
Cemeteries in North Carolina
Churches completed in 1913
Churches in Rockingham County, North Carolina
Primitive Baptists